Leptosynanceia is a monotypic genus of ray-finned fish belonging to the subfamily Synanceiinae, the stonefishes, which is classified within the family Scorpaenidae, the scorpionfishes and relatives, its only species is Leptosynanceia asteroblepa which is called the mangrove stonefish in Malaysia. This species native to the brackish and fresh waters of Southeast Asia. This species is an extremely dangerous fish whose venom can cause a human to die within 1 to 2 hours after contact. The pain caused by the venom is described as "agonizing".

Taxonomy
Leptosynanceia was first formally described as a genus by the Dutch physician and zoologist Pieter Bleeker as a monotypic genus with Synanceia asteroblepa, which had been described by John Richardson from the coast of New Guinea, as its only species. The genus Leptosynanceia is classified within the tribe Synanceiini which is one of three tribes in the subfamily Synanceeinae within the family Scorpaenidae. However, other authorities regard Synanceiidae as a valid family and the Synanceiini as the subfamily Synanceiinae. The genus name is a combination of lepto meaning "thin" and Synanceia, the typical stonefish genus to which Richardson originally assigned this species, alluding to its more slender body than those stonefishes. The specific name is a compound of asteros, meaning "star", and blepos, meaning "see", to mean "stargazer", an allusion to the uptirned eyes on the top of the head.

Description
Leptosynanceia has an almost vertical mouth, its eyes are place on the dorsal surface of its head and direct outwards and upwards. The dorsal fin has 16 spines and 5 soft rays. The anal fin has 3-4 spines and 5 or 6 soft rays and there is a single spine and 4 soft rays in the pelvic fin. The colour is pale brown, slightly paler ventrally with a mottled head and darker blotches on the body.

Distribution and habitat
Leptosynanceia is found in the eastern Indian Ocean and the western Pacific Ocean. It has been recorded from Singapore, Sumatra, Borneo and New Guinea, It is found in fresh water rivers and brackish water estuarine environments

References

Synanceiini
Taxa named by Pieter Bleeker
Venomous fish
Monotypic ray-finned fish genera
Taxa named by John Richardson (naturalist)